The 2015–16 Oman Second Division League (known as the Omantel Second Division League for sponsorship reasons) is the 40th edition of the third-highest division overall football league in Oman. The season began on 16 October 2015. Bahla Club are the defending champions. Bidia SC were crowned the champions of the 2015–16 Oman Second Division League on 26 February 2016 after they secured a 2-1 win over Al-Salam SC at the Nizwa Sports Complex.

Group A

Clubs season-progress

Group B

Clubs season-progress

Semifinals
4 teams played a knockout tie. 2 ties were played over two legs. The first match was played between Al-Wusta Club and Al-Salam SC on 19 April 2015. Bidia SC and Al-Salam SC earned promotion to Oman First Division League on winning their respective Semi-finals ties.

1st Legs

2nd Legs

Third place play-off
Dibba Club and Al-Wusta Club after losing their respective ties in the Semi-finals played the Third place play off match on 26 February 2016 at the Nizwa Sports Complex

Finals
Al-Salam SC and Bidia SC after winning their respective ties in the Semi-finals played the finals of the 2015-16 Oman Second Division League on 26 February 2016 at the Nizwa Sports Complex

OFA Awards
Oman Football Association awarded the following awards for the 2015–16 Oman Second Division League season.
Top Scorer: Idrees Al-Idrisi (Al-Wusta)
Best Player: Fahad Al-Zaabi (Al-Salam)
Best Goalkeeper: Abdullah Al-Harthy (Bidia)
Best Coach: Mohammed Sabah (Bidia)
Best Team Manager: Tariq Al-Junaibi (Al-Wusta)
Fair Play Award: Al-Ittifaq Club

See also
2015–16 Oman Professional League
2015–16 Sultan Qaboos Cup
2015–16 Oman First Division League

References

Oman Second Division League seasons
Oman
2015–16 in Omani football